The South is a 1990 novel by Irish writer Colm Tóibín.

The idea for The South came to Tóibín in 1982 whilst on a train from Dublin to his native town of Enniscorthy. He observed a fellow passenger, a well-dressed woman "rich—not gaudy rich, but old rich", whom he took to be a Protestant. She continued to figure in his mind.

He spent three years working on the novel, by night and at the weekend.

Plot summary
Katherine, a Protestant woman from Ireland, arrives in Barcelona in the 1950s having left her husband and son. Very slowly she starts discovering the city and gets to meet local painters. The Francoist State and the still recent civil war are present in the characters' past. She meets the artist Miguel and they both move to a remote village in the Pyrenees.

The endings of the hardback and paperback editions differ. Tóibín altered two sentences of the book's ending because he thought it was too soft. He said in 2021: "There was one moment where it looked like they were going to be happy forever. What I had was slightly too sugary".

Publication
The novel was first published by Serpent's Tail in 1990 and a revised edition was published by Picador Press. 

Viking Penguin secured the U.S. publication rights.

Reception
Tóibín showed the completed manuscript to Fintan O'Toole, who was a work colleague at the time (Tóibín was a journalist in Dublin). O'Toole later said he was "just staggered": "It was obvious from the first twenty pages Colm was an artist". Tóibín's view on The South decades later was: "If you look at it, you see that the sentence structure is more or less taken from Didion".

The novel drew comparisons with the work of Milan Kundera.

The Washington Post'''s Barbara Probst Solomon referred to "the tremendous amount Tóibín leaves unsaid".

Awards and nominationsThe South'' won the Aer Lingus Literature Prize in 1991.

References

1990 Irish novels
Fiction set in the 1950s
Novels by Colm Tóibín
Novels set in Barcelona
1990 debut novels
Serpent's Tail books